In mathematics, the group Hopf algebra of a given group is a certain construct related to the symmetries of group actions. Deformations of group Hopf algebras are foundational in the theory of quantum groups.

Definition

Let G be a group and k a field. The group Hopf algebra of G over k, denoted kG (or k[G]), is as a set (and a vector space) the free vector space on G over k. As an algebra, its product is defined by linear extension of the group composition in G, with multiplicative unit the identity in G; this product is also known as convolution.

Note that while the group algebra of a finite group can be identified with the space of functions on the group, for an infinite group these are different. The group algebra, consisting of finite sums, corresponds to functions on the group that vanish for cofinitely many points; topologically (using the discrete topology), these correspond to functions which are non-zero only on a finite set.

However, the group algebra  and  – the commutative algebra of functions of G into k – are dual: given an element of the group algebra  and a function on the group  these pair to give an element of k via  which is a well-defined sum because it is finite.

Hopf algebra structure

We give kG the structure of a cocommutative Hopf algebra by defining the coproduct, counit, and antipode to be the linear extensions of the following maps defined on G:

The required Hopf algebra compatibility axioms are easily checked. Notice that , the set of group-like elements of kG (i.e. elements  such that  and ), is precisely G.

Symmetries of group actions

Let G be a group and X a topological space. Any action  of G on X gives a homomorphism , where F(X) is an appropriate algebra of k-valued functions, such as the Gelfand-Naimark algebra  of continuous functions vanishing at infinity.

This may be described by a linear mapping

 endows F(X) with an important extra structure, described below.

Hopf module algebras and the Hopf smash product

Let H be a Hopf algebra. A (left) Hopf H-module algebra A is an algebra which is a (left) module over the algebra H such that  and

When  has been defined as in the previous section, this turns F(X) into a left Hopf kG-module algebra, which allows the following construction.

Let H be a Hopf algebra and A a left Hopf H-module algebra. The smash product algebra  is the vector space  with the product

,

.

The cyclic homology of Hopf smash products has been computed. However, there the smash product is called a crossed product and denoted - not to be confused with the crossed product derived from -dynamical systems.

References

Hopf algebras
Quantum groups